La Vie de Bohème is a studio album released by jazz pianist Dave Burrell. The album is Burrell's take on the 1896 operatic adaptation of Henri Murger's 1851 novel La Vie de Bohème by Giacomo Puccini, titled La bohème. The album has been called "a fine example of the similarities between the free jazz and classical worlds." Though this is not a straight performance of the opera, each of the acts are represented with "a great deal of improvisation."

Track listing
"First Act" — 20:00
"Second Act (1st Part)" — 5:00
"Second Act (2nd Part)" — 12:00
"Third Act" — 5:15
"Fourth Act" — 7:45

Personnel 
Dave Burrell — piano
Eleanor Burrell — vocals
Ric Colbeck — piano, trumpet, harp
Claude Delcloo  — chimes, drums, tympani
Beb Guérin  — bass
Grachan Moncur III  — trombone, chimes
Kenneth Terroade — flute, saxophone (tenor)

References 

1969 albums
Dave Burrell albums
BYG Actuel albums
Albums produced by Alan Douglas (record producer)
Albums produced by Michael Cuscuna